Maharani Kasiswari College, established in 1964,  is an undergraduate women's college in Kolkata, West Bengal, India. It offers undergraduate courses in science, arts and commerce. It is affiliated with the University of Calcutta. It shares premises with Maharaja Manindra Chandra College (day college) and Maharaja Sris Chandra College (evening college).

Departments

Science

Mathematics
Physics
Food and Nutrition
Statistics
Computer

Arts and Commerce

Bengali
English
Hindi
History
Geography
Political Science
Philosophy
Education
Economics
Sociology
Tourism and Travel Management
Commerce

Accreditation
Maharani Kasiswari College is recognized by the University Grants Commission (UGC). It was accredited by the National Assessment and Accreditation Council (NAAC) and awarded B grade, an accreditation that has expired.

See also 
List of colleges affiliated to the University of Calcutta
Education in India
Education in West Bengal

References

External links
Maharani Kasiswari College

Educational institutions established in 1964
University of Calcutta affiliates
Universities and colleges in Kolkata
Women's universities and colleges in West Bengal
1964 establishments in West Bengal